The SP-63 is a highway in the southeastern part of the state of São Paulo in Brazil.  The highway begins at the 18.6 km of the E23 in Itatiba up to Piracaia.

Highway sections
Luciano Consoline: SP-63 (around the 18.6 km and the E25) in Itatiba
Romildo Prado: Louveira - Itatiba
Alkindar Monteiro: Itatiba - Bragança Paulista - SP-123
Aldo Bollini, Padre: Bragança Paulista - Piracaia

References

Highways in São Paulo (state)